Balinț is a commune in Timiș County, Romania. It is composed of four villages: Balinț (commune seat), Bodo, Fădimac and Târgoviște. It borders Bara to the north, Coșteiu to the south, Belinț and Ghizela to the west and Bethausen to the east.

History 
Since the 10th–11th centuries, there have been numerous floods on the middle course of the Bega River. Balinț, being located 500 meters from the Bega riverbed, was periodically flooded. In the 11th century, some of the villagers moved to a hearth protected from floods. A new village appears, derived from the first, Balințul de Sus (Upper Balinț), located in the Church valley, and Balințul de Jos (Lower Balinț) remains on the old hearth. The first recorded mention of Balinț dates from 1488, when Count Ferenc Haraszti donates the Felső-Bályncz estate to his daughter. By 1554 the two settlements merged under the name Balinch. In 1604, around Balinț, there are battles between the troops of George I Rákóczi and the rebels of Stephen Bocskai (future Prince of Transylvania) and Gabriel Bethlen. Balinț is mentioned in the documents from 1690 and 1717, meaning that it continued to exist during the Turkish occupation. At the 1717 census it had 20 houses. In 1739 Austrian troops retaliated against the villagers who supported the Turks during the Austro-Turkish War of 1737–1739 and took part in the uprising. The villages of Balinț, Fădimac and Târgoviște were burned down by the imperial armies. By 1740 the Austrians set new hearths for the burned villages.

Bodo seems to have existed since at least the 14th century, mentioned by the name Bodov in 1344. Later, in 1401, a certain Bodofalva is mentioned. However, the village itself was founded only in 1890, by Hungarian colonists who settled near the Romanian village of Păru, forming the current hearth of the village. Between 1880 and 1890, more than 50 Hungarian families settled here, most of them from the Debrecen area. After the union of Banat with Romania, the village was called Bodofalva for a while. The Romanians also called it Bodăul Mare.

The first recorded mention of Fădimac can be considered a diploma from 1488 where the name Fagymag appears. From the period 1500–1550 there are numerous other Hungarian and Turkish documents attesting the village under different derived names. The village has always been Romanian and was located on the hill to the north of the village. After conquering Banat, the Austrians named it Vitigmak. At the 1717 census it appeared with 23 houses and was owned by the state.

The first recorded mention of Târgoviște dates from 1690 in Marsigli's notes. The village is probably older, since the traces of a medieval earth fortification were discovered here.

Politics and administration  
The commune of Balinț is administered by a mayor and a local council composed of 11 councilors. The mayor, Dănuț Crașovan, from the Social Democratic Party, has been in office since 2004. As from the 2020 local elections, the local council has the following composition by political parties:

Demographics 

Balinț had 1,596 inhabitants at the 2011 census, down 9% from the 2002 census. Most inhabitants are Romanians (69.05%), larger minorities being represented by Hungarians (23.37%) and Roma (2.19%). For 4.32% of the population, ethnicity is unknown. By religion, most inhabitants are Eastern Orthodox (66.79%), but there are also minorities of Reformed (19.74%), Greek Catholics (3.57%), Roman Catholics (2.88%) and Pentecostals (1.69%). For 4.32% of the population, religious affiliation is unknown.

References 

Communes in Timiș County
Localities in Romanian Banat